Leandro Grech (born 24 October 1980) is an Argentine footballer who most recently played for German side SV Elversberg.

References

External links
 Leandro Grech at BDFA.com.ar 
 
 
 Leandro Grech Interview

1980 births
Living people
Argentine people of Maltese descent
Association football midfielders
Footballers from Rosario, Santa Fe
Argentine footballers
Argentine expatriate footballers
Argentino de Rosario footballers
San Martín de Mendoza footballers
Newell's Old Boys footballers
Colo-Colo footballers
Club Aurora players
Aldosivi footballers
FC Erzgebirge Aue players
SV Sandhausen players
SpVgg Unterhaching players
SC Pfullendorf players
SV Elversberg players
2. Bundesliga players
3. Liga players
Regionalliga players
Chilean Primera División players
Expatriate footballers in Chile
Expatriate footballers in Germany
Expatriate footballers in Bolivia
Argentine expatriate sportspeople in Chile
Argentine expatriate sportspeople in Bolivia
Argentine expatriate sportspeople in Germany